Todd Widom (born April 24, 1983, Coral Springs, Florida) is a retired American professional tennis player.

Biography
Widom grew up in Coral Springs, Florida. He is the son of Eloise Widom and has one brother, Gary. He is married to Beth Eisenberg also of Coral Springs. He coaches professional, college, and junior tennis players at his academy called TW Tennis, located in Coral Springs. He is an avid sports fan and in his spare time enjoys golf and fishing.

Career
Widom attended and played at the University of Miami from 2001 to 2003. During this time, he was recognized as "Most Outstanding Player" at the Big East tournament and was named to the USA Tennis Collegiate Team.

In doubles, he and the American Scott Lipsky won an ATP Challenger tournament in Busan, Korea, in May 2006. Widom reached a career high singles ranking of 200 in July 2006 and a doubles ranking of 162 in April 2009.

Within the span of three years, Widom was diagnoses with eye cancer, two knee injuries, and elbow inflammation in his elbow, but recovered and continues to play and travel across the world regularly.

Playing mainly challenger tournaments, Widom achieved his career breakthrough when he won three matches in 2009 to qualify for the SAP Open in San Jose, and went on to beat 44th ranked Robby Ginepri, former 21st ranked Taylor Dent, and lost in three sets to the 21st ranked Radek Štěpánek. The following month, Widom went back to California and qualified for the ATP Masters 1000 at Indian Wells. He started by beating Iván Navarro in straight sets and eventually lost to 12th ranked David Ferrer.

This turn of events prompted ESPN to report that "a red-headed, blue-eyed journeyman from Coral Springs, Florida, made the largest leap of any player on the ultimate tennis ladder. After a series of outrageous misfortunes, Todd Widom did something extraordinary: He reached the quarterfinals of the SAP Open in San Jose."

ATP Challenger and ITF Futures finals

Singles: 8 (3–5)

Doubles: 12 (3–9)

Performance timelines

Singles

References

External links

1983 births
Living people
American male tennis players
Miami Hurricanes men's tennis players
Sportspeople from Coral Springs, Florida
Tennis people from Florida
J. P. Taravella High School alumni
People from Pembroke Pines, Florida